Ivo Svoboda may refer to:
 Ivo Svoboda (footballer) (born 1977), professional Czech football player
 Ivo Svoboda (politician) (1948–2017), Minister of Finance of the Czech Republic 1998–99